Ľubomír "Lubo" Moravčík (born 22 June 1965) is a Slovakian football manager and former player. A creative midfielder renowned for his technical ability, he was capable of unleashing powerful, accurate shots, and pinpoint crosses with both feet. He played for teams in Czechoslovakia and Slovakia, France, Germany, Japan, and Scotland. During his time at Scottish club Celtic, he made nearly 130 appearances, scoring 35 goals and winning two Scottish Premier League titles.

Moravčík also played internationally for Czechoslovakia (42 caps, seven goals) and Slovakia (38 caps, six goals). He was a member of the Czechoslovak team at the 1990 FIFA World Cup.

Club career
Moravčík began his career at Czechoslovak First League club Plastika Nitra, making his senior debut in 1983. He spoke about his early career in an interview with the Slovakian podcast, Podcast Výkrok: "I grew up in a very successful generation of Nitra, with whom we became champions of Slovakia in pupils, as younger teenagers we finished third and again became masters as older teenagers. But during my time in Shala, I never dreamed of the first league. However, when Nitra was on the verge of falling out, the club's management decided to give the young players a chance. And that meant my entry into the Premier League scene."

Moravčík went on to make over 170 appearances for the club before departing in 1990 to join French Ligue 1 club Saint-Étienne, where he played over 230 matches. He later moved to Bastia and then MSV Duisburg in Germany.

On 27 October 1998, Moravčík signed for Scottish Premier League side Celtic for a fee of £330,000. The move linked him up with fellow Slovak Jozef Vengloš, who was Celtic manager at the time. Initially sceptical of the impact a player aged then 33 could have, Moravčík became a hero in the eyes of the Parkhead faithful, forming an outstanding partnership with Henrik Larsson. He made his Celtic debut against Old Firm rivals Rangers on 21 November 1998 and scored first two goals for the Hoops in what turned out to be a memorable 5–1 victory.

He stayed at Celtic Park for a total of four seasons, winning two Scottish championships, one Scottish Cup and two Scottish League Cups. Former teammates Larsson, Chris Sutton and Stiliyan Petrov have all named him in their One to Eleven highlighting his two-footedness, his ability with both feet. In 2015, Moravčík said of his time in Glasgow: "My favourite time, my most special time, was at Celtic. They said I was a 'gift from God' but it was the opposite – Celtic was a gift from God to me…Celtic is unique."

Moravčík played what turned out to be his last game for Celtic on 21 April 2002, a 1–1 draw with Rangers in which he assisted Alan Thompson's equaliser and was substituted for Steve Guppy in the 72nd minute. On 4 May, the day before the 2002 Scottish Cup Final against Rangers, he announced that he would leave the club after the final and join JEF United Ichihara in the J-League, a move that would link him up with Jozef Venglos, who first brought him to Parkhead in 1998. He told the Daily Record: "I don't want to play in the last league game at Aberdeen [the following week] so I will be leaving Celtic and Scotland after the Cup final. Because I am going to Japan I will have to start pre-season training at the beginning of June and, before that, I need a holiday." Moravčík spent the entire final on the bench as Celtic lost the match 3–2.

International career
Moravčík is one of his country's most capped players, with a total of 80 appearances for Czechoslovakia and Slovakia between 1987 and 2000. He played for Czechoslovakia at the 1990 FIFA World Cup finals in Italy, where he was sent off against Germany in the quarter-final in Milan. Germany won the game 1–0.

Post-playing career
Moravčík started a career in coaching as a manager of Slovak national U-17 team. He was later coaching FC ViOn Zlaté Moravce, the team from highest Slovak league – Corgoň Liga. He is now the vice-president of the Slovak Football Association and assistant of ŠKF Sereď.

Moravčík also has an engineering degree from the Slovak University of Agriculture, which he gained whilst playing for Nitra. "I think getting a college degree in addition to professional sports is more complicated nowadays than when I studied," he said. "The communist regime was proud that the athletes growing up in its establishment had a university degree and were very accommodating. Athletes had individual study plans, various concessions, teachers sometimes turned a blind eye, and were proud to educate a representative of Czechoslovakia. Honestly, I was not an exceptional student, but I tried to come to school honestly and learn. Professors also appreciated my efforts and did not hinder me. Today, graduating from university is extremely challenging for a top athlete with multi-phase daily training, rehabilitation, training and matches. The athlete must define his priorities. I was lucky that, in addition to sports, they also provided us with education. Today is a different time, but I consider the completion of the graduation to be a necessary minimum, this can certainly be managed in addition to sports."

Style of play
A free kick specialist, Moravčík was reminiscent of the old-fashioned inside forward. He was also known for his ability to use both his left and right legs. "It's easy, always notice which foot the player is leading the ball," he told Podcast Vykroč in November 2021. "I never led the ball with my left foot. Yes, I knew how to move it and kick it with my left hand. Through targeted long-term training, I improved my left leg so that I did not distinguish at all when kicking and passing, whether by kicking with my left or right foot. But I always led the ball right."

Henrik Larsson said, "For me, [Moravčík] is one of the best players I ever played with. Still to this day I don't know if he was right-footed or left-footed."

Career statistics

Club

International

Honours
Bastia
 UEFA Intertoto Cup: 1997

Celtic
 Scottish Premier League: 2000–01, 2001–02
 Scottish Cup: 2001
 Scottish League Cup: 2000, 2001

Individual
 Czechoslovak Footballer of the Year: 1992
 Slovak Footballer of the Year: 2001

References

External links
 
 
 
 
 
 
 Stars of the past: Lubomir Moravcik at Footandball.net

1965 births
Living people
Sportspeople from Nitra
Association football midfielders
Czechoslovak footballers
Czechoslovakia international footballers
Slovak footballers
Slovakia international footballers
Dual internationalists (football)
1990 FIFA World Cup players
SC Bastia players
AS Saint-Étienne players
FC Nitra players
MSV Duisburg players
Celtic F.C. players
JEF United Chiba players
J1 League players
Ligue 1 players
Scottish Premier League players
Bundesliga players
Slovak expatriate footballers
Slovak expatriate sportspeople in France
Slovak expatriate sportspeople in Germany
Slovak expatriate sportspeople in Scotland
Expatriate footballers in France
Expatriate footballers in Japan
Expatriate footballers in Germany
Expatriate footballers in Scotland
MFK Ružomberok managers
Czechoslovak expatriate footballers
Czechoslovak expatriate sportspeople in France
Slovak expatriate sportspeople in Japan
Slovak football managers
FC ViOn Zlaté Moravce managers